Eduardo Fernando Mingas (born 29 January 1979) is an Angolan professional basketball player who currently plays for Interclube of the Angolan Basketball League. He also plays for the Angola national basketball team.

Professional career
On 21 October 2021, at age 42, Mingas signed with Interclube for a third stint.

International career 
Mingas has represented the Angola at the 2002 World Championship, 2004 Summer Olympics and the 2006 World Championships.

References

External links
 
 World Championship 2002

1979 births
Living people
Angolan men's basketball players
Basketball players at the 2004 Summer Olympics
Basketball players at the 2008 Summer Olympics
Olympic basketball players of Angola
People from Lunda Sul Province
Atlético Petróleos de Luanda basketball players
C.R.D. Libolo basketball players
G.D. Interclube men's basketball players
Power forwards (basketball)
African Games gold medalists for Angola
African Games medalists in basketball
2014 FIBA Basketball World Cup players
2010 FIBA World Championship players
2006 FIBA World Championship players
2002 FIBA World Championship players
Competitors at the 2003 All-Africa Games
2019 FIBA Basketball World Cup players